On Saturday, January 10, 1998, a basketball derby game between the teams of Czarni Słupsk and AZS Koszalin took place in the northern Polish city of Słupsk.

History
After the match, hundreds of fans were peacefully going back home. At the intersection on Szczecińska Street, a group of 12 people decided to cross the street on red light. This was noticed by nearby policemen in a patrol vehicle, Dariusz Woźniak and Robert K. The group noticed the police vehicle and allegedly began to run away. Woźniak caught up to a member of the group, the 13-year-old Przemysław Czaja and repeatedly hit his head and neck using his baton. This fact was witnessed by tens of people. Despite pleas, the policemen did not call an ambulance for the unconscious Czaja, who was lying on the sidewalk. At 8:20 p.m., the boy died, later it turned out that the death had been caused by hemorrhage.

News about the incident spread quickly around the city and next day, on Sunday, January 11, a group of supporters of the two Słupsk's sports clubs – Czarni and Gryf, gathered in the morning on Szczecińska Street, to erect a cross there. At about midday the crowd moved to the vicinity of local prosecutor's office, demanding punishment of the responsible officer, who was being questioned inside the building. At about 4 p.m. the prosecutor issued a statement stating that the victim stumbled while running away, and hit his head against a trolley bus traction post, which caused the death. The same day, Woźniak was temporarily arrested, but then bailed by the local worker's union.

First skirmishes started at 8 p.m. An angry crowd, chanting "blood for blood", and comparing the police's actions to those of Gestapo and Milicja Obywatelska, erected barricades in the center of the city and started to hurl rocks at police. The night of January 11–12 was very violent. Hundreds of rioters attacked police stations and destroyed 22 police vehicles. Police responded with tear gas. For the next three days Słupsk was marred by violent fights, and as local police department was unable to tame the rioters, help was called from neighboring cities. Finally, on Wednesday, January 14, the situation was brought under control by some 1000 policemen patrolling the streets.

According to the Słupsk police, 239 adults were detained and 84 were taken into custody. The local magistrate court received 251 delinquency motions, and the juvenile court took up 32 cases. 72 police officers were injured, two of whom were hospitalized.

In 2001 Dariusz W., the officer  who killed the boy, was sentenced to 8 years in prison. However, he was released after 4 years due to poor health. Another officer, Robert K. who was sitting in a cruiser during the incident, was accused of failing to help the victim and sentenced to 8 months in prison.

In September 2005 the Circuit Court in Gdańsk decided that the family of the victim would get compensation in the amount of 300 000 PLN (around $100 000), paid by the Słupsk Police Department.

The happening was the most notable case of police brutality in Poland after the fall of communism.

Sources

  A Gazeta Wyborcza daily article describing the event,
  Interview with Senator Zbigniew Romaszewski,

See also
2015 Knurów riots
Police brutality

External links
 A photo of riot police in Slupsk,
 A short movie about the 1998 events
 
 

1998 riots
Riots and civil disorder in Poland
1998 in Poland
Protests in Poland
Sports riots
Police brutality in Europe
1998 crimes in Poland